Shufflepuck Café is an air hockey video game developed by Christopher Gross, Gene Portwood and Lauren Elliott for Broderbund (not a table shuffleboard video game, as the name would suggest—though that was the intention when the name was first coined by Christopher Gross). Originally developed for the Macintosh, it was later adapted by Broderbund for the Amiga, Atari ST, Amstrad CPC, Nintendo Entertainment System, X68000, PC-98, and MS-DOS.

Gameplay

There are two game modes. The player can compete in a tournament, playing against opponents who visit the Café, or can practice against each opponent to find out their weakness in a single-player match.

The game is controlled via the computer's mouse. The bat on the playing field bounces a hockey puck between the player and the opponent. When one of the players manages to knock the hockey puck past the opponent's bat, the player scores. The first player to score a set number of points (usually 15) wins the match.

Shufflepuck Café includes nine opponents:
Skip Feeney: A short male human in his early 20s, wearing glasses. Has just started in shufflepuck and thus is very nervous and slow to react, making him easy to beat.
Visine Orb: A green-coloured alien with huge eyes, who is only about 1.5 metres tall and can barely see over his end of the table. He jitters his paddle all over his end of the table, so that his serves often bounce back and forth on their way to the player.
Vinnie the Dweeb: A veteran shufflepuck player who keeps his calm and is not easily surprised. While not particularly strong, his playing style is consistent and is a slight step up in difficulty from the two previous opponents.
Lexan Smythe-Worthington: A lizard-like alien, a filthy rich playboy who gets 30,000 credits per year to keep away from his home world. He begins playing fiercely and hard to beat, but as play progresses, he sips his champagne, making him inebriated and less focused on the game, thus easier to beat. When defeated, he hiccups and passes out.
The General (also known as Eneg Doowtrop - "Gene Portwood" spelled backwards): A pig-like alien who pretends to be a military general, although he really is just a militaristic gung-ho enthusiast. Recently divorced, he is addicted to shufflepuck, which he plays with fierceness and devotion.
Nerual Ttoille ("Lauren Elliott" spelled backwards): A non-corporeal alien. Mimics the player's own shot power and angle. He occasionally opens his robe to expose a one-eyed alien at chest level, who either smirks or snarls at the player depending on whether he has just won or lost a point.
Princess Bejin: A woman with supernatural powers. When it is her turn to serve the puck, she uses telekinesis to float it out to the center of the table and drift it to one side before sending it toward the player. One of two different sound effects accompanies each serve, indicating whether the puck will move in the same or opposite direction. When defeated, she reveals a little bit of her cleavage.
Biff Raunch: The reigning champion. A tough, street-hardened biker dude who plays a mean game. He has no weaknesses and only the best players will be able to beat him.
DC3: A robot waiter. DC3 serves as a training partner, who can be customised to be as easy or as difficult as the player wishes. He does not play in the main championship.

In some versions, during gameplay there is a cheat option, which gives the player the option of winning or losing the game, winning or losing the tournament or gaining or losing five points.

Subsequent releases include Shufflepuck Revolution (an OS X version, now discontinued) and Shufflepuck (from the same developer).

Plot
There is a general storyline behind the Amiga and NES versions of the game in which the player is an inter-galactic salesman whose spaceship has broken down. He needs to find a telephone to call the breakdown service and get the spaceship fixed. Shufflepuck Café is the nearest place for miles, so he goes in to use their telephone. The main eight Shufflepuck players are standing in his way and will not let him get to the phone until he has beaten them all. Once all are defeated, the player gets in his spaceship and flies off into the distance.

Reception
The game was reviewed in 1989 in Dragon #142 by Hartley, Patricia, and Kirk Lesser in "The Role of Computers" column. The reviewers gave the game 4 out of 5 stars. On release, Famitsu magazine scored the Famicom version of the game a 23 out of 40. A retrospective review for Retrogamer from 2008 said the game was a "forgotten gem" although unfortunately lacking a 2 player mode.

Reviews
Zero (Nov, 1989)
Amiga Power (Oct, 1991)
Computer and Video Games (Oct, 1989)
Commodore User (Oct, 1989)
Amiga Joker (Dec, 1989)
ACE (Advanced Computer Entertainment) (Oct, 1989)

References

External links
Shufflepuck Café at Lemon Amiga

1989 video games
Air hockey
Amiga games
Amstrad CPC games
Apple IIGS games
Atari ST games
Broderbund games
Infogrames games
Ubisoft games
Cancelled Commodore 64 games
Cancelled ZX Spectrum games
DOS games
Classic Mac OS games
NEC PC-9801 games
Nintendo Entertainment System games
X68000 games
Hockey video games
Video games developed in the United States